Lefa or LEFA may refer to:

Persons
Lefa (rapper), member of French rap band Sexion d'Assaut
Lefa Mokotjo, Lesotho ambassador and diplomat
Lefa Tsutsulupa (born 1980), South African football (soccer) player

Abbreviations
Ligue Élite de Football Américain, French league of American Football,  LEFA
Lesotho Football Association a.k.a. LEFA
Lount Elms Field Archery Club a.k.a. LEFA (was Long Eaton Field Archers)  http://lefa.org.uk

Others
Lefa language, or Fa’ language, one of the Bantu languages of Cameroon
Lefas, brand name of motorcycles, engines and other systems created by the Greek engineer Thanassis Lefas